Bossiaea arenitensis , commonly known as sandstone winged pea, is a species of flowering plant in the pea family Fabaceae and is endemic to the Kimberley region of Western Australia. It is an erect, spindly shrub with winged stems, winged cladodes, scale-like leaves and yellow, red and burgundy-coloured flowers.

Description

Taxonomy and naming
Bossiaea arenitensis was first formally described in 2015 by Russell Lindsay Barrett in the journal Nuytsia from specimens collected on Mount Elizabeth Station in 2007. The specific epithet (arenitensis) is the latinised version of arenite, a form of sandstone on which this species grows.

Distribution and habitat
Sandstone winged pea grows in woodland on sandstone ridges and outcrops and is relatively widespread in the Kimberley region of Western Australia.

Conservation status
This bossiaea is listed as "not threatened" by the Government of Western Australia Department of Parks and Wildlife.

References

Mirbelioids
arenitensis
Rosids of Western Australia
Taxa named by Russell Lindsay Barrett
Plants described in 2015